Treli Kardia (Crazy Heart) is the second single from Helena Paparizou as a solo singer. The song is featured on the CD Single "Anapandites Kliseis" which was released on December 28, 2003 and also at Paparizou's first solo album Protereotita released in June 2004. The song became a big radio hit in all Greek radio stations as long as many Swedish singers wanted to cover the song into their language in 2010.

Music video
The music video was filmed in a football court in which played two most famous Greek teams, Olympiacos and Panathinaikos during the winter season of 2004. It was directed by Giorgos Gavalos and after was included in Helena's first DVD series titled "My Number One" released in 2005. Helena appeared in the video singing with a ballet on a stage in the middle of the field during the half time of the match.

Track listing
CD single
2. "Treli Kardia" – 3:29

Protereotita Album
16. "Treli Kardia" – 3:29

References

2003 singles
2003 songs
Helena Paparizou songs
Song recordings produced by Alex P
Greek-language songs